Cattleya mooreana is a species of orchid native to Peru. It is considered an endangered species since 1997 by the IUCN.

References

External links

mooreana
Flora of Peru